Alba County is a county (județ) of Romania located in the historic region of Transylvania. Its capital is Alba Iulia, a city with a population of 63,536.

Name 
"Alba", meaning "white" in Latin and Romanian, is derived from the name of the city of Alba Iulia. In Hungarian, the county is known as Fehér megye (fehér also meaning white), and in German as Kreis Karlsburg.

Demographics 
 Romanians – 89.9%
 Hungarians – 4.8%
 Romani – 4.7%
 Germans (Transylvanian Saxons) – 0.2%

Geography 

The Apuseni Mountains are in the northwest; the northeastern side of the Parâng Mountains group – the Șureanu and Cindrel mountains – are in the south. In the east there is the Transylvanian Plateau with deep but wide valleys. The three main elements are separated by the Mureș River valley.

The main rivers are the Mureș River and its tributaries, the Târnava, the Sebeș, and the Arieș.

Neighbors 
 Sibiu County and Mureș County to the east.
 Bihor County and Arad County to the west.
 Cluj County to the north.
 Hunedoara County to the southwest.
 Vâlcea County to the south.

Economy 
The predominant industries in the county are:
 Food industry
 Textile industry
 Wood industry
 Mechanical components
 Paper and packaging materials industry
 Chemical industry

The mineral resources exploited in Alba county are metals (gold, silver, copper), salt, and construction materials, including marble and granite.

Tourist attractions 

The main tourist attractions in the county are:
 The city of Alba Iulia
 The Apuseni Mountains
 Scărișoara karst complex
 Maidens' Fair on the 
 The Dealul cu melci ("Snail Hill") west of Vidra
 Barren Detunata and Shaggy Detunata (Detunatele)
 The Câlnic Citadel and the castle of Gârbova
 The towns and churches of Sebeș and Aiud
 The Ocna Mureș resort
 The Țara Moților ethnographical area. Situated in the Apuseni Mountains, Țara Moților is a region with strong and distinct Romanian traditions.
 Roșia Montană Mining Cultural Landscape - Mining began 2000 years ago on Mt. Kirnik (Cârnic), with well-preserved Roman galleries. A Canadian company attempted an open-pit mine, but abandoned the project around 2007. Roșia Montană is a famous locality among mineral collectors for fine native gold specimens.

Politics 
The Alba County Council, renewed at the 2020 local elections, consists of 32 county councillors, with the following party composition:

Administrative divisions 

Alba County has 4 municipalities, 7 towns, and 67 communes.

 Municipalities:
 Aiud
 Alba Iulia – county seat; pop. 58,761 (as of 2011)
 Blaj
 Sebeș

 Towns:
 Abrud
 Baia de Arieș
 Câmpeni
 Cugir
 Ocna Mureș
 Teiuș
 Zlatna

 Communes:
 Albac
 Almașu Mare
 Arieșeni
 Avram Iancu
 Berghin
 Bistra
 Blandiana
 Bucerdea Grânoasă
 Bucium
 Câlnic
 Cenade
 Cergău
 Ceru-Băcăinți
 Cetatea de Baltă
 Ciugud
 Ciuruleasa
 Crăciunelu de Jos
 Cricău
 Cut
 Daia Româna
 Doștat
 Fărău
 Galda de Jos
 Gârbova
 Gârda de Sus
 Hopârta
 Horea
 Ighiu
 Întregalde
 Jidvei
 Livezile
 Lopadea Nouă
 Lunca Mureşului
 Lupșa
 Meteș
 Mihalț
 Mirăslău
 Mogoș
 Noșlac
 Ocoliș
 Ohaba
 Pianu
 Poiana Vadului
 Ponor
 Poșaga
 Rădești
 Râmeț
 Rimetea
 Roșia de Secaș
 Roșia Montană
 Sălciua
 Săliștea
 Sâncel
 Sântimbru
 Săsciori
 Scărișoara
 Șibot
 Sohodol
 Șona
 Șpring
 Stremț
 Șugag
 Unirea
 Vadu Moților
 Valea Lungă
 Vidra
 Vințu de Jos

Historical county

Historically, Alba de Jos County was located in the central-western part of Greater Romania, in the southwestern part of Transylvania, with a territory identical with the old Alsó-Fehér County of Hungary. After the administrative unification law in 1925, the name of the county changed to Alba County and the territory was reorganized. It was bordered on the west by Hunedoara County, to the north by Turda County, and to the east by the counties of Sibiu and Târnava-Mică. Its territory included the central part of the current Alba County.

Administration 

The county originally consisted of seven districts (plăși):

 Plasa Abrud (headquarters at Abrud)
 Plasa Aiud (headquarters at Aiud)
 Plasa Ighiu (headquarters at Ighiu)
 Plasa Ocna Mureș (headquarters at Ocna Mureș)
 Plasa Sebeș (headquarters at Sebeș)
 Plasa Teiuș (headquarters at Teiuș)
 Plasa Vințu de Jos (headquarters at Vințu de Jos)

Subsequently, Plasa Ighiu was abolished and two other districts were established, leaving these:

 Plasa Abrud (seven villages, headquarters at Abrud)
 Plasa Aiud (thirty-three villages, headquarters at Aiud)
 Plasa Alba Iulia (eighteen villages, headquarters at Alba Iulia)
 Plasa Ocna Mureș (twenty-one villages, headquarters at Ocna Mureș)
 Plasa Sebeș (twenty-one villages, headquarters at Sebeș)
 Plasa Teiuș (twenty villages, headquarters at Teiuș)
 Plasa Vințu de Jos (thirteen villages, headquarters at Vințu de Jos)
 Plasa Zlatna (eighteen villages, headquarters at Zlatna)

There were four towns: Alba Iulia, Abrud, Aiud, and Sebeș.

Population 
According to the census data of 1930, the county's population was 212,749, of which 81.5% were Romanians, 11.3% Hungarians, 3.6% Germans, 1.8% Romanies, 1.4% Jews, as well as other minorities. In the religious aspect, the population consisted of 50.1% Eastern Orthodox, 31.6% Greek Catholics, 7.5% Reformed (Calvinists), 3.4% Roman Catholics, 3.3% Evangelical (Lutherans), 1.2% Unitarians, and other minorities.

Urban population 
In 1930, the urban population of the county was 33,365, of which 58.8% were Romanians, 23.0% Hungarians, 8.2% Germans, 6.2% Jews, 1.6% Romanies, as well as other minorities. From the religious point of view, the urban population was made up of 38.3% Eastern Orthodox, 21.4% Greek Catholic, 14.7% Reformed (Calvinist), 7.2% Evangelical (Lutheran), 6.5% Jewish, as well as other minorities.

After 1938
After the 1938 Administrative and Constitutional Reform, this county merged with the counties of Ciuc, Odorhei, Sibiu, Târnava Mare, and Târnava Micǎ to form Ținutul Mureș. The county was re-established in 1940, but dissolved again in 1950. It was re-established in 1968 in its current borders.

People
Notable natives include:
Ion Agârbiceanu
Lucian Blaga
Avram Iancu
Sofronie of Cioara
Ioan Suciu

References

External links 

  Alba County on memoria.ro

 
Counties of Romania
Geography of Transylvania
1925 establishments in Romania
1938 disestablishments in Romania
States and territories disestablished in 1938
States and territories established in 1925
1940 establishments in Romania
1950 disestablishments in Romania
1968 establishments in Romania
States and territories established in 1940
States and territories disestablished in 1950
States and territories established in 1968